Joaquín Ernesto Hendricks Díaz (born 7 November 1951 in Chetumal, Quintana Roo) is a Mexican politician belonging to the Partido Revolucionario Institucional . From 1991 to 1994, he held a seat in the Chamber of Deputies, representing Quintana Roo's First District. Between 1999 and 2005 he served as governor of the state of Quintana Roo.

References

1951 births
Living people
Politicians from Quintana Roo
People from Chetumal, Quintana Roo
Institutional Revolutionary Party politicians
Governors of Quintana Roo
Members of the Chamber of Deputies (Mexico)
20th-century Mexican politicians
21st-century Mexican politicians